Allendorf may refer to the following places:

In Germany:
Allendorf, Gießen, a town in the Gießen district, Hesse
Allendorf, Waldeck-Frankenberg, a municipality in the Waldeck-Frankenberg district, Hesse
Allendorf, Rhein-Lahn, a municipality in Rhineland-Palatinate
Allendorf, Thuringia, a municipality in Thuringia
Bad Sooden-Allendorf, a town in the Werra-Meißner district, Hesse
Sundern-Allendorf, part of Sundern in North Rhine-Westphalia
Stadtallendorf, in Hesse (historically: Allendorf)
The German name for Aloja, a city in Latvia
In the United States:
Allendorf, Iowa

...